Eulimella digenes is a species of sea snail, a marine gastropod mollusk in the family Pyramidellidae, the pyrams and their allies.

Description
The shell size varies between 3 mm and 5 mm. The teleoconch whorls are slightly convex. The orthocline (i.e. at right angles to the growth direction of the cone) growth lines are inverted-S-shaped. The columella lacks a tooth or fold.

Distribution
This marine species occurs in the following locations:
 Azores at a depth of 1385 m 
 Cape Verdes at a depth of 930 m

References

External links
 To Encyclopedia of Life
 To World Register of Marine Species

digenes
Gastropods described in 1896
Molluscs of the Azores
Gastropods of Cape Verde